Silvano Schiavon (4 November 1942 – 21 October 1977) was an Italian racing cyclist. He rode in the 1970 Tour de France and finished fourth in the 1969 Giro d'Italia.

References

External links
 

1942 births
1977 deaths
Italian male cyclists
Place of birth missing
People from Zero Branco
Cyclists from the Province of Treviso